Mycetocola miduiensis is a Gram-positive, aerobic, psychrotolerant and non-spore-forming bacterium from the genus Mycetocola which has been isolated from soil from the Midui glacier from the Tibet Province.

References

External links
Type strain of Mycetocola miduiensis at BacDive -  the Bacterial Diversity Metadatabase

Microbacteriaceae
Bacteria described in 2013